Outlaws or The Laws of the Border is a 2021 Spanish film directed by Daniel Monzón adapting the novel of the same name by Javier Cercas. It stars Marcos Ruiz, Begoña Vargas and Chechu Salgado.

Premise 
Set in the Summer of 1978, the fiction follows Nacho, a 17-year old student living in Girona who befriends Zarco and Tere, two young criminals.

It has been presented as a revisitation of the quinqui film genre.

Cast

Production 

Penned by Jorge Guerricaechevarría, the screenplay is an adaptation of the novel of the same name by Javier Cercas.

Netflix secured the international rights. It has a reported budget of 7 million €. Directed by Daniel Monzón, shooting lasted for 10 weeks and wrapped in November 2020. Balter Gallart worked as art director and Carles Gusi as director of cinematography.

Release 
The film premiered on 25 September 2021 at the 69th San Sebastián International Film Festival, bringing the festival to a closure.

Distributed by Warner Bros. Pictures España, it was theatrically released in Spain on 8 October 2021.

The film was set for a 22 November 2021 streaming release on Netflix, using the English-language title Outlaws.

Reception 
Fausto Fernández of Fotogramas gave the film 4 out 5 stars, positively highlighting the triangle formed by the characters Nacho, Tere and Zarco.

Philipp Engel of Cinemanía gave it 3½ out of 5 stars. He wrote that the Begoña Vargas' lead performance ends up eating those from the two male lead performers'. He considered that the atmosphere "halfway" works.

Josu Eguren of El Correo gave the film 2 out of 3 stars. He considered the film to be "stimulating reflection on the gap between memory and nostalgia" so pervasive in the Spanish contemporary historical discourse but ultimately dominated by "cheating digressive monologues transformed into images".

Federico Marín Bellón of ABC gave the film 4 out of 5 stars, considering it to be "a magnificent portrait, a new and stylized look" of the era already extensively portrayed by the quinqui genre.

Accolades 

|-
| align ="center" rowspan ="28" | 2022 || rowspan ="2"| 9th Feroz Awards || Best Supporting Actor (film) || Chechu Salgado ||  || rowspan="2" | 
|-
| Best Trailer || Miguel Ángel Sanantonio || 
|-
| rowspan = "4" | 77th CEC Medals || colspan = "2" | Best Film ||  || rowspan = "4" | 
|-
| Best Supporting Actor || Chechu Salgado || 
|-
| Best New Actor || Chechu Salgado || 
|-
| Best Adapted Screenplay || Jorge Guerricaechevarría, Daniel Monzón || 
|-
| rowspan ="6"| 36th Goya Awards || Best Adapted Screenplay || Daniel Monzón, Jorge Guerricaechevarría ||  || rowspan="6" | 
|-
| Best Original Song || "Las leyes de la Frontera" by Alejandro García Rodríguez, Antonio Molinero León, Daniel Escortell Blandino, José Manuel Cabrera Escot, Miguel García Cantero || 
|-
| Best New Actor || Chechu Salgado || 
|-
| Best Makeup and Hairstyles || Sarai Rodríguez, Benjamín Pérez, Nacho Díaz || 
|-
| Best Art Direction || Balter Gallart || 
|-
| Best Costume Design || Vinyet Escobar || 
|-
| rowspan = "14" | 14th Gaudí Awards || colspan = "2" | Best Non-Catalan Language Film ||  || rowspan = "14" | 
|-
| Best Director || Daniel Monzón || 
|-
| Best Actress || Begoña Vargas || 
|-
| Best Actor || Chechu Salgado || 
|-
| Best Production Supervision || Goretti Pagès || 
|-
| Best Art Direction || Balter Gallar || 
|-
| Best Editing || Mapa Pastor || 
|-
| Best Original Music || Derby Motoreta's Burrito Kachimba || 
|-
| Best Cinematography || Carles Gusi || 
|-
| Best Costume Design || Vinyet Escobar || 
|-
| Best Sound || Isaac Bonfill, Oriol Tarragó, Marc Orts || 
|-
| Best Visual Effects || Raúl Romanillos, Míriam Piquer || 
|-
| Best Makeup and Hairstyles || Sarai Rodríguez, Nacho Díaz, Benjamín Pérez || 
|-
|colspan = "2" | Public's Choice Award for Best Film || 
|-
| 30th Actors and Actresses Union Awards || Best New Actress || Begoña Vargas ||  || 
|-
| Spanish Screenwriters' Union Awards || Best Screenplay in a Drama Feature Film || Jorge Guerricaechevarría, Daniel Monzón ||  || 
|}

See also
 List of Spanish films of 2021

References

External links 
 Outlaws at ICAA's Catálogo de Cinespañol
 

Films shot in Spain
2021 crime films
Spanish crime films
Films based on Spanish novels
Films set in 1978
Films set in Spain
2020s Spanish-language films
Atresmedia Cine films
Ikiru Films films
Films shot in the province of Girona
2020s Spanish films